The Midas Coffin is a novel by Martin Cruz Smith published under the pseudonym Simon Quinn in 1975.  It was fifth of six installments in a series titled The Inquisitor.  The entire series was published inside a two-year span between 1974 and 1975.  The novel's protagonist is a former CIA agent named Francis Xavier Killy who has become a lay brother in the Militia Christi.  The novel follows Killy as he tries to track down a killer among a group of fanatics while trying to handle a train heist orchestrated by a former colleague.  It was nominated by the Mystery Writers of America for an Edgar Award in the category of Best Original Paperback Novel, Smith's third Edgar nomination.

Plot

A suicide bomber named Ivan Bolotny trying to destroy Lenin's Mausoleum ends up killing himself in a locked room.  Shortly thereafter his brother is murdered and a bishop named Nescou has gone missing.  The Militia Christi is tasked by the Catholic Church with solving the crime because church members can be implicated, and their lay brother Francis Killy is sent to Switzerland to track down Nescou.  Whilst there he runs into a former colleague named Carlin who worked for the British Secret Service as has partnered with a Russian massage therapist named Marya.  It turns out that Marya, Nescou and the Bolotny brothers are/were members of an fanatical anti-sex sect called Skoptsy.  Carlin, who is not a member of the sect, reveals to Killy that he quit the Secret Service after inheriting money from a relative and stealing a patent to refine titanium.  His company, however, has gone broke and he is now planning a train heist and requests Killy's help. Killy informs his superior, Cella, of this plan and is instructed to go along with it.  The plan involves tracking down a Russian train and breaking into it whilst it is stationary, removing gold bullion, and then replacing it with gold-plated lead so that the theft is not detected until well after it has been removed.  Though the heist is successful, the Skoptsy ambush Killy, and Nescou tries to shoot and kill Killy, but is ultimately unsuccessful.  Killy returns to report to Cella and is sent to Russia to track down Nescou and the gold in the resorts of Sochi.  While divining in a mud bath in Sochi, Killy discovers that the gold is hidden under the baths, but Nescou enters the room and tries to shoot Killy again.  Killy manages to submerge Nescou in the water and drown him.  Killy then returns to Switzerland where he expects Carlin has returned.  Carlin must dilute the quality of the gold because all Russian gold is refined to .999, whereas other countries only refine gold to .995.  Killy locates the smelting plant and tracks down Carlin.  The two have a confrontation where Carlin reveals that he did not know about the ambush.  Killy tells Carlin that the grandson of the man whose patent Carlin stole is aiming to get revenge, but the man enters the room and shoots Carlin before he can escape.  Killy returns home to Rome where he runs into his former girlfriend and tells his frequently absent partner Mario that he plans on making sure she is happy with her new husband and on rescuing her should she be ill-treated.

In Other Media

The plot of The Midas Coffin bears a strikingly similar resemblance to the plot of an episode of Breaking Bad titled "Dead Freight".  Both narratives feature a train heist where a train is stopped and its contents are removed and then replaced with materials that look similar but are not of the same quality.  Both narratives also require that the switch occur in a brief and specific amount of time and sets the characters racing against a clock to complete the swap.

1975 American novels
American thriller novels
Novels by Martin Cruz Smith